Ramon Paul Layugan Hernando (born August 27, 1966) is an associate justice of the Supreme Court of the Philippines. He was appointed by President Rodrigo Duterte to replace Associate Justice Samuel Martires.

Education 

Hernando studied at Tuguegarao East Central School from 1972 to 1978; later graduating from St. Louis High School of Tuguegarao in 1982. He earned his Bachelor of Laws from the San Beda College of Law and was admitted to the bar in 1991. He later pursued post-graduate studies at the Ateneo de Manila University Graduate School of Business and San Beda Graduate School of Law.

Career 

He first worked as member of the staff of late Associate Justice Florenz Regalado and later with the staff of retired associate justice Edgardo Paras in the years after his admission into the bar. He also worked as Department of Justice prosecutor and was appointed San Pablo, Laguna Regional Trial Court judge in 2003. He was later appointed RTC judge in Quezon City in 2006, and was elevated to the appellate court in 2010. He has also taught at his alma mater San Beda and the Ateneo Law School.

Supreme Court appointment 

Hernando originally applied for a vacancy created by the retirement of Associate Justice Jose C. Mendoza in 2017, but the seat ultimately went to Alexander Gesmundo. In October 2018 he was appointed by Rodrigo Duterte to replace Samuel Martires who was appointed ombudsman. He is Duterte's sixth appointment to the Supreme Court.

References 

Living people
1966 births
Associate Justices of the Supreme Court of the Philippines
20th-century Filipino lawyers
San Beda University alumni
Ateneo de Manila University alumni
Academic staff of San Beda University
Academic staff of Ateneo de Manila University
People from Tuguegarao
21st-century Filipino judges